Dennis Endras (born 14 July 1985) is a German professional ice hockey goaltender. He is currently playing with Augsburger Panther of the Deutsche Eishockey Liga (DEL).

Playing career
Endras began playing for EHC Bayreuth in the Oberliga, the third-tier of ice hockey in Germany, in 2003–04. He played for Bayreuth again in 2004–05, but also made his Deutsche Eishockey Liga (DEL) debut that season with the Augsburger Panther. Over the next three seasons he spent time playing in the DEL and the 2nd Bundesliga for EV Landsberg, the Ravensburg Tower Stars, and the Frankfurt Lions.

He earned a permanent DEL position for the 2008–09 season with Augsburg, recording a 24–20–0 record.

In July 2010, Endras signed a contract with the Minnesota Wild of the NHL. On September 25, 2011, the Wild placed Endras on waivers so they could assign him to start the season with the Houston Aeros of the AHL. Endras subsequently played 6 games with the Aeros before leaving to HIFK Helsinki of the Finnish SM-liiga.

Coming back to Germany, Endras signed a Contract with the team Adler Mannheim in the Deutsche Eishockey Liga on May 25, 2012.

International play

Endras has played internationally for the German national team at the 2009 and 2010 Men's World Ice Hockey Championships and was selected for the 2010 Olympics. At the 2010 World Championship, competed in Germany, Endras was named the tournament's most valuable player. He became the first German selected MVP of the tournament, and the first to appear on the tournament's All-Star team since 1987.

Awards and honours

References

External links

1985 births
Adler Mannheim players
Augsburger Panther players
Frankfurt Lions players
German ice hockey goaltenders
HIFK (ice hockey) players
Houston Aeros (1994–2013) players
Ice hockey players at the 2010 Winter Olympics
Ice hockey players at the 2018 Winter Olympics
Living people
Medalists at the 2018 Winter Olympics
Olympic ice hockey players of Germany
Olympic medalists in ice hockey
Olympic silver medalists for Germany
People from Immenstadt
Sportspeople from Swabia (Bavaria)